Al Romero (6 September 1911 – 30 September 1985) was a Mexican boxer. He competed in the men's welterweight event at the 1932 Summer Olympics.

References

1911 births
1985 deaths
Mexican male boxers
Olympic boxers of Mexico
Boxers at the 1932 Summer Olympics
Boxers from Los Angeles
American boxers of Mexican descent
Welterweight boxers